An electrodynamic speaker driver, often called simply a speaker driver when the type is implicit, is an individual transducer that converts an electrical audio signal to sound waves.  While the term is sometimes used interchangeably with the term speaker (loudspeaker), it is usually applied to specialized transducers which reproduce only a portion of the audible frequency range. For high fidelity reproduction of sound, multiple loudspeakers are often mounted in the same enclosure, each reproducing a different part of the audible frequency range. In this case the individual speakers are referred to as drivers and the entire unit is called a loudspeaker.  Drivers made for reproducing high audio frequencies are called tweeters, those for middle frequencies are called mid-range drivers, and those for low frequencies are called woofers, while those for very low bass range are subwoofers.   Less common types of drivers are supertweeters and rotary woofers. 

The electroacoustic mechanism most widely used in speakers to convert the electric current to sound waves is the dynamic or electrodynamic driver,  invented in 1925 by Edward W. Kellogg and Chester W. Rice, which creates sound with a coil of wire called a voice coil suspended between the poles of a magnet.  There are others which are far less widely used:  electrostatic drivers, piezoelectric drivers,  planar magnetic drivers, Heil air motion drivers, and ionic drivers, among others.

Components

Speaker drivers include a diaphragm that moves back and forth to create pressure waves in the air column in front, and depending on the application, at some angle to the sides. The diaphragm is typically in the shape of a cone for low and mid frequencies or a dome for higher frequencies, or less commonly, a ribbon, and is usually made of coated or uncoated paper or polypropylene plastic. More exotic materials are used on some drivers, such as woven fiberglass, carbon fiber, aluminum, titanium, pure cross carbon and a very few use PEI, polyimide, PET film plastic film as the cone, dome or radiator.

All speaker drivers have a means of electrically inducing back-and-forth motion. Typically there is a tightly wound coil of insulated wire (known as a voice coil) attached to the neck of the driver's cone. In a ribbon speaker the voice coil may be printed or bonded onto a sheet of very thin paper, aluminum, fiberglass or plastic. This cone, dome or other radiator is mounted at its outer edge by a flexible surround to a rigid frame which supports a permanent magnet in close proximity to the voice coil. For the sake of efficiency the relatively lightweight voice coil and cone are the moving parts of the driver, whereas the much heavier magnet remains stationary. Other typical components are a spider or damper, used as the rear suspension element, simple terminals or binding posts to connect the audio signal, and possibly a compliant gasket to seal the joint between the chassis and enclosure.

Enclosures and acoustic isolation 
Drivers are almost universally mounted into a rigid enclosure of wood, plastic, or occasionally metal. This loudspeaker enclosure or speaker box isolates the acoustic energy from the front of the cone from that of the back of the cone. A horn may be employed to increase efficiency and directionality. A grille, fabric mesh, or other acoustically neutral screen is generally provided to cosmetically conceal the drivers and hardware, and to protect the driver from physical damage.

Operation 
In operation, a signal is delivered to the voice coil by means of electrical wires, from the amplifier through speaker cable, then through flexible tinsel wire to the moving coil. The current creates a magnetic field that causes the diaphragm to be alternately forced one way or the other, by the magnetic field produced by current flowing in the voice coil, against the field established in the magnetic gap by the fixed magnet structure as the electrical signal varies. The resulting back-and-forth motion drives the air in front of the diaphragm, resulting in pressure differentials that travel away as sound waves.

The spider and surround act as a spring restoring mechanism for motion away from the balanced position established when the driver was assembled at the factory.  In addition, each contributes to centering the voice coil and cone, both concentrically within the magnet assembly, and front-to-back, restoring the voice coil to a critical position within the magnetic gap, neither toward one end nor the other. 

The voice coil and magnet essentially form a linear motor working against the centering "spring tension" of the spider and surround. If there were no restriction on travel distance imposed by the spider and surround, the voice coil could be ejected from the magnet assembly at high power levels, or travel inward deep enough to collide with the back of the magnet assembly. The majority of speaker drivers work only against the centering forces of the spider and surround, and do not actively monitor the position of the driver element or attempt to precisely position it.  Some speaker driver designs have provisions to do so (typically termed servomechanisms);  these are generally used only in woofers and especially subwoofers, due to the greatly increased cone excursions required at those frequencies in a driver whose cone size is well under the wavelength of the some of the sounds it is made to reproduce (ie, bass frequencies below perhaps 100 Hz or so).

Performance characteristics 
Speaker drivers may be designed to operate within a broad or narrow frequency range. Small diaphragms are not well suited to moving the large volume of air that is required for satisfying low frequency response. Conversely, large drivers may have heavy voice coils and cones that limit their ability to move at very high frequencies. Drivers pressed beyond their design limits may have high distortion. In a multi-way loudspeaker system, specialized drivers are provided to produce specific frequency ranges, and the incoming signal is split by a crossover. Drivers can be sub-categorized into several types: full-range, tweeters, super tweeters, mid-range drivers, woofers, and subwoofers.

Applications
Speaker drivers are the primary means for sound reproduction. They are used among other places in audio applications such as loudspeakers, headphones, telephones, megaphones, instrument amplifiers, television and monitor speakers, public address systems, portable radios, toys, and in many electronics devices that are designed to emit sound.

See also
Electrical characteristics of dynamic loudspeakers, chief electrical characteristic of a dynamic loudspeaker's driver
 Loudspeaker#Driver design: dynamic loudspeakers
 Loudspeaker enclosure

References

Loudspeakers